Synodontis violaceus is a species of upside-down catfish found in the Chad, Niger, Senegal and Volta basins.  This species grows to a length of  SL.

References

External links 

violaceus
Freshwater fish of West Africa
Fish of Cameroon
Fish of Chad
Taxa named by Jacques Pellegrin
Fish described in 1919